Valkyrie is a superheroine appearing in American comic books published by Marvel Comics. Created by Roy Thomas and John Buscema, the character first appeared in The Avengers #83 (December 1970). She is based on the Norse mythological figure Brynhildr. Valkyrie became a mainstay of the superhero team known as the Defenders and a close ally and one-time love interest of the superhero Thor.

Valkyrie, also known by her Asgardian name Brunnhilde, was selected by Odin to lead his personal unit of shield-maidens, the Valkyrior. Renowned for her prowess in battle, Valkyrie is often accompanied by her winged horse Aragorn and carries the enchanted sword Dragonfang. In the 2010s, Valkyrie became a founding member of the Secret Avengers and co-leader of the Fearless Defenders with Misty Knight. Among Valkyrie's other aliases are Barbara Norris, Samantha Parrington, Sian Bowen and Annabelle Riggs, who all, at one point, hosted her spirit. Samantha Parrington, one of Valkyrie's previous hosts, later received superhuman powers and became a member of the Defenders herself.

Tessa Thompson portrays the character in the Marvel Cinematic Universe films Thor: Ragnarok (2017), Avengers: Endgame (2019), and Thor: Love and Thunder (2022).

Publication history
The Valkyrie first appeared as a guise of the Enchantress in The Avengers #83 (December 1970) and was created by Roy Thomas and John Buscema. Thomas used another iteration of the character when the Valkyrie persona was placed into a mortal woman named Samantha Parrington as an adversary for the Hulk in The Incredible Hulk vol. 2 #142 (August 1971).

Roy Thomas publicly stated the character's creation, "I wanted a sort of female Thor, but of course at first I just made her a disguise of the Enchantress in THE AVENGERS.  I left the look mostly to John Buscema, though I may have said I wanted her to be blonde."

Writer Steve Englehart and artist Sal Buscema put the Valkyrie's essence into another mortal woman, Barbara Norris, in The Defenders #4 (February 1973) and had the character join the group as a longtime member. Englehart has stated that he added the Valkyrie to the Defenders "to provide some texture to the group". Steve Gerber introduced Jack Norris as the estranged husband of Barbara but the Valkyrie persona had no memory of him. Writers David Anthony Kraft and Ed Hannigan explained some of the Valkyrie's backstory in The Defenders #66-68 (Dec. 1978–Feb. 1979). Three years later, writers J. M. DeMatteis and Mark Gruenwald wrote a follow-up story in The Defenders #107-109 (May–July 1982) which resolved remaining plot points from the Kraft and Hannigan story.

The Valkyrie remained a member of the Defenders through most of the series' run and is apparently killed in the final issue, #152 (Feb. 1986). According to writer Peter B. Gillis, the Valkyrie's death was part of an editorial edict to free up the surviving Defenders for use in X-Factor. The character was restored to life in a Doctor Strange storyline written by Gillis in 1988 and made only a few appearances in the 1990s.

In 2001, writer Kurt Busiek and co-writer/penciller Erik Larsen revived the Defenders series and restored Samantha Parrington as the mortal incarnation of the Valkyrie.

The Valkyrie's Asgardian iteration was restored in a one-shot comic book and the character appeared regularly throughout the Secret Avengers series, from issue #1 (July 2010) through its final issue #37 (March 2013). Valkyrie appears in the 2013 series Fearless Defenders by Cullen Bunn and Will Sliney.

Valkyrie began appearing as part of the Asgardians of the Galaxy team in 2018, and she plays a part in the War of the Realms storyline in 2019.

Fictional character biography
Brunnhilde was selected by Odin, King of the Gods of the realm of Asgard, to lead the Valkyrior (the Choosers of the Slain), a group of warrior goddesses who would appear over the battlefields of mortal worshippers of the Asgardian gods and choose which of the fallen were worthy to be taken to Valhalla, the land of the honored dead. Brunnhilde served capably in this capacity for centuries.

According to a sentient, disembodied eye that claimed to have once belonged to Odin, the Asgardian monarch once gave his son Thor the mortal identity of the warrior Siegmund. Circumstances forced Odin to decree that Siegmund must be slain. Brunnhilde, recognizing that Odin was acting against his true wishes, sought to protect Siegmund, but Odin himself then caused Siegmund's death. Brunnhilde helped Siegmund's pregnant lover, Sieglinde get to safety. As punishment for her defiance, Odin removed Brunnhilde's Asgardian powers and immortality and cast her into a trance. She was eventually awakened by Siegfried, the son of Siegmund and Sieglinde and another mortal incarnation of Thor.

Brunnhilde and Siegfried became lovers, and she made him invulnerable so long as his back was not turned on his foe. Siegfried fell under the influence of magic and betrayed her. He was later murdered, and Brunnhilde, still in love with him, leapt into his blazing funeral pyre (this part of her background was based on the Volsunga saga). Odin restored both of them to life, restoring their Asgardian roles and powers, but removing their memories of their earthly lives. It is unclear how much truth, if any, there is to this account by the eye.

Brunnhilde and her fellow Valkyries continued to gather heroic mortal warriors for Valhalla until roughly a millennium ago, when Odin was forced to cease virtually all interaction with the Earth in accordance with a pact that he and the leaders of Earth's other pantheons of gods made with the extraterrestrial Celestials. From then onward, the Valkyries could only choose slain heroes from among fallen Asgardian warriors. Brunnhilde was bitter over being barred from choosing warriors on Earth and roamed Asgard in pursuit of something meaningful to do. In a tavern on the outskirts of Marmoragard, Brunnhilde encountered Amora the Enchantress, who offered her a life of adventure. For several weeks Brunnhilde accompanied the Enchantress on her conquests. Brunnhilde soon discovered Amora's immoral nature and tried to end their partnership. In response the Enchantress trapped Brunnhilde within a mystic crystal of souls. While Brunnhilde's body remained in suspended animation, her immortal soul became Amora's plaything. Over the centuries the Enchantress used Brunnhilde's spiritual essence to give the Valkyrie's powers to herself or to her pawns.

Specific instances of Amora's exploitation of the Valkyrie before recent years are not yet known. The first time the Enchantress assumed the Valkyrie's physical aspect in recent years was in a plot to lead a handful of female superhumans against the male Avengers as the Lady Liberators. Her true identity was discovered and her plan thwarted. Months later, the Enchantress bestowed the Valkyrie's power upon a socialite named Samantha Parrington in an attempt to get revenge on the Hulk.

Finally, a woman driven mad by being trapped in another mystical dimension, Barbara Norris, was given the Valkyrie's power and consciousness by the Enchantress to help her then-allies, the group of superhumans called the Defenders, escape from the clutches of the sorceress Casiolena. Amora did not undo her spell on Norris after Casiolena's defeat. As a result, Norris' body now possessed Brunnhilda's consciousness, appearance, and powers, while Norris' own mental essence was trapped in Brunnhilde's real body in Asgard. Aware that she was an immortal essence in a mortal woman's body, the Valkyrie briefly left the Defenders in an attempt to discover Barbara Norris' past. She meets Norris' father, Alvin Denton, shortly before his death and then returns to the Defenders.

It was not until a minor Asgardian warrior named Ollerus attempted to take over Valhalla that the Valkyrie's two mixed aspects met for the first time. Brunnhilde's mental essence trapped in Norris's transformed body, fought Norris’ mental essence trapped in Brunnhilde's real body. At the end of that encounter, the Valkyrie's body, still possessed by Norris’ mind, was consigned to Niffleheim, the realm inhabited by the spirits of the non-heroic Asgardian dead, while Brunnhilde's mind in Norris’ transformed body accompanied the Defenders, who had made the other dimensional journey with her, back to Earth.

For reasons yet unknown, Brunnhilde was not concerned at this time about reuniting her mind with her true body. It was not until Barbara Norris’ body was murdered that the Valkyrie's spirit and mind were inadvertently freed from their mortal host. With the help of Doctor Strange's magic, Brunnhilde regained her true body, which was rescued from Niffleheim by the Enchantress. Back in her real body, Brunnhilde regained her full memory and normal warrior personality as well. Brunnhilde then battled Amora and banished her to the crystal of souls.  Feeling estranged from Asgard in general and Odin in particular for their neglect of her centuries-long plight, Brunnhilde chose to return to Earth with the Defenders.

Odin placed the dangerously powerful self-styled goddess Moondragon into Brunnhilde's charge. Brunnhilde was to teach Moondragon humility, and Moondragon served alongside Brunnhilde in the Defenders. Brunnhilde was to take action against Moondragon should she again become a menace. Eventually Moondragon reformed, but later she fell once again under the malevolent influence of the alien entity called the Dragon of the Moon. Moondragon attacked the Defenders, but Brunnhilde, given temporary additional powers by Odin for this occasion, including the power to grow to gigantic stature, opposed her. Brunnhilde summoned other Valkyries to her aid and together with two other Defenders, the Angel and Cloud, they defeated Moondragon but failed to capture her.

Months later Moondragon returned to attack the Defenders. During this encounter, her power was vastly augmented by the alien Beyonder. In order to defeat the Dragon, Brunnhilde and the Eternal called Interloper projected their immortal life forces against it. They were joined by Defenders member Andromeda and the Defenders' former foe Manslaughter, for it was necessary that Brunnhilde's and Interloper's life forces pass through "mortal instruments" in order that Moondragon be defeated as well. Joining hands, the four allies hurled the tremendous power of their combined life forces at the Dragon, Moondragon, and the Gargoyle II, whose body was now under the Dragon's control. Three other Defenders went to rescue endangered innocents, and when they returned, Brunnhilde, Interloper, Andromeda, Manslaughter, Moondragon, and Gargoyle had all seemingly been transformed into statues of ashes and dust, and the Dragon of the Moon was apparently gone.

Brunnhilde was restored to life by Doctor Strange, now in the host body of a woman known as Sian Bowen. The other Defenders, Interloper, Andromeda, and Manslaughter were restored to life as well and they formed the Dragon Circle to battle the Dragon of the Moon. After the Dragon of the Moon was defeated, Brunnhilde returned to Asgard. Brunnhilde was killed in battle just before Loki's destruction of Asgard.

With the return of the Asgardians to Earth, Brunnhilde was next seen as a member of the Secret Avengers. Writer Ed Brubaker confirmed that the Valkyrie on the team was indeed the original Brunnhilde.

After the 2011 storyline "Fear Itself", Brunhilde seemingly defects from the Secret Avengers, embarking in a mission to steal and recover for herself the hammers used by the "Worthy", Cul's servants. She later reveals to have stopped consuming the Apples of Idunn, thus lessening her stamina and resilience and reverting to a mortal form, and as a Valkyrior she is able to seal within herself the hammers. She plans to die after the deed is over, so as to banish the worthy from the human plane of existence for the rest of eternity. At the end of the series, the All Mother (Freyja, Gaea, and Idunn) task her with selecting a new group of Valkyries. Only this time the new Valkyries are to be all women from Earth. The story continues in the 2013 The Fearless Defenders series in which Valkyrie recruits Misty Knight, Danielle Moonstar, Hippolyta, and the mortal scientist Annabelle Riggs as part of the new Valkyrior to stop Caroline le Fey, the daughter of Morgan le Fey, and the Doommaidens, corrupted undead Valkyries who have awakened in the Valkyrior's absence. During this time, Valkyrie develops a brief romance with Riggs, who later becomes host to Valkyrie's spirit after Riggs sacrifices herself to save the team.

During the 2014 "AXIS" storyline, Valkyrie is among the heroes recruited by an inverted Doctor Doom to join his team of Avengers. During the 2017 "Monsters Unleashed" storyline, Valkyrie and Hippolyta are seen fighting Leviathon Tide monsters in Edinburgh. Angela recruits her to join the Asgardians of the Galaxy.

During the "War of the Realms" storyline, Valkyrie and the rest of the Valkrior are massacred by Malekith and his forces invading New York where Valkyrie is beheaded by Malekith.

Powers and abilities
Valkyrie is the strongest of all Valkyrior. Like all her people, her body is several times denser than that of humans. She is not immortal, but she ages far more slowly than humans. Valkyrie is immune to all earthly diseases and is difficult to injure. Her Asgardian physiology grants her enhanced levels of stamina. Valkyrie can perceive the approach of death, in the form of a "deathglow" surrounding a person's body. She does not know how death will come but she can tell that it is imminent. Valkyrie can transport herself and a dying or dead body to and from the realm of the dead by willing it. Valkyrie has had extensive training in sword fighting as well as unarmed combat and horseback riding. Her natural fighting ability is among the best of all Asgardians, matched only by Sif.

Weapons and equipment
Valkyrie carries two weapons of choice. An enchanted sword named Dragonfang. A wizard named Kahji-Da was said to have carved the sword from a tooth of an extra-dimensional dragon. The sword eventually passed into the possession of the Ancient One, who in turn gave it to his disciple Doctor Strange.  Strange went on to return it to the Valkyrie after she had bequeathed the virtually indestructible Black Knight's Ebony Blade to its rightful owner. An unnamed iron spear.

Valkyrie rides a winged horse named Aragorn. Aragorn was given to her by the current Black Knight.

Reception

Accolades 

 In 2011, Comics Buyer's Guide ranked Valkyrie 65th in their "100 Sexiest Women in Comics" list.
 In 2012, IGN ranked Valkyrie 30th in their "Top 50 Avengers" list.
 in 2014, Autostraddle ranked Valkyrie 3rd in their "11 Female Superheroes I Wish Marvel Would Make Movies About" list.
 In 2019, CBR.com ranked Valkyrie 5th in their "10 Greatest Swordsmen & Women In DC & Marvel Comics" list.
 In 2020, CBR.com ranked Valkyrie 7th in their "15 Strongest Swordfighters In Marvel Comics" list.
 In 2022, The Mary Sue ranked Valkyrie 4th in their "All of Thor’s Love Interests in Marvel Comics" list.
 In 2022, Screen Rant included Valkyrie in their "10 Best Marvel Characters Who Debuted In The Avengers Comics" list, "9 Most Powerful Valkyrie Variants In Marvel Comics" list, and in their "10 Best Marvel Characters Who Debuted In The Avengers Comics" list.

Other characters named Valkyrie

The Enchantress first transformed Samantha Parrington into the Valkyrie temporarily to gain revenge against the Hulk. On Earth, Pluto and Lorelei much later restored the Valkyrie's powers within Samantha Parrington. Pluto tricked Lorelei though, erasing her memory, draining her powers, and turning her into a duplicate of Valkyrie. While Samantha was used by Pluto to turn Earth into a realm of the dead, Lorelei was found by the Defender Nighthawk, who believed she was the real Valkyrie and made her a Defender, though she never spoke. When the Defenders tried to stop Pluto, Lorelei battled Samantha and was restored to her former self. Samantha was freed from Pluto's control and she became part of the Defenders again as Valkyrie. She and her teammate Hellcat later got an apartment together and Parrington remembered her real name when someone called her by her nickname "Sam". The two superheroines then met her parents, who thought that her transformation into Valkyrie was just a phase she was going through. Much to Parrington's chagrin, her parents are proud of her and turned their mansion into the Defenders base.

Jane Foster became Thor for a time, and lost her powers. All Valkyries died during The War of the Realms, and Foster becomes the new Valkyrie by the end of it.

Other versions

Ultimate Marvel
In the Ultimate Marvel universe, Valkyrie is a 19-year-old girl named Barbara Norris who aspires to play the public role of superhero, despite, at first, having no actual powers or skills. She describes herself as a female Thor, only without the hammer, strength, or weather-powers. When Hank Pym was dismissed from the Ultimates, he decided to join the Defenders, a group of good hearted, but delusional, somewhat farcical individuals enamored with superheroes but without powers or exceptional abilities. This is how he met Barbara, who called herself "Thor-Girl", telling Pym during introductions that while she doesn't have any powers, she is extensively proficient in martial arts. This turned out to be a lie to impress Pym; she later confesses to him that she barely made it to an Orange Belt in karate and it took her several tries to pass the test.

Valkyrie next appears in The Ultimates 3 #1, now apparently super-powered, riding a black Pegasus and wielding a large, supposedly mystical sword that she uses to cleave Venom nearly in two, but seems to have no idea where these powers or weapons came from. At that point, she has been in a romantic live-in relationship with Thor for weeks and despite cultural differences, they are very close and allude to being in love. Since her last appearance, she appears to have been granted super strength and limited invulnerability; other superhuman attributes and abilities remain unknown. She speaks with a distinct valley girl accent, and while she does not seem to be the most intelligent of her teammates, she makes up for it with her loyalty, especially to Thor, and her big heart, along with being very powerful. At several points, she makes references to having lived a quiet, normal human life before becoming superhuman. She suggests she is more akin to Thor than it may seem, possibly meaning they may have some sort of shared Asgardian heritage. Her deepest fear is returning to the powerless, poor, and somewhat comically ordinary existence she had before. When confronted with this fear by the illusion-casting Mastermind, just before her two captors decide to assault her sexually, she is broken free of the illusion by a shadowy figure who claims to be the source of her new powers; she then retaliates by killing Mastermind and dismembering his partner Pyro, taking both his hands off at the wrists with her sword.

During the 2009 "Ultimatum" storyline it is revealed that Valkyrie was killed and transported to Valhalla, the Asgardian afterlife for fallen warriors run by Hela, an Asgardian goddess, who is presented as above most other Asgardian gods in power and station. Thor learns of this and transports himself to Hela's dimension, demanding he let Valkyrie live again. Hela, then states that if he is able to overcome the challenge presented to him, he may bring Valkyrie back to the land of the living. In the middle of the ensuing battle, Thor finds that Captain America's soul is also there, having been killed in the real world as well. Thor and Capt. America win the challenge and Hela grants Thor's request, but with the catch that once a soul has entered Hela's realm, it cannot leave without being substituted, so Thor gives up his soul so that Valkyrie may live and Hela returns her to Earth, whole and unharmed (Capt. America is given a reprieve on his soul as well and is returned to the land of the living, but how this worked with the "Soul Quota" stipulation is not addressed), while Thor's soul remains in the afterlife. Valkyrie, enraged and heart broken at the loss and sacrifice of her love, joins the battle once more and attacks Magneto while trying to receive Thor's hammer and severs his arm. Magneto then uses his powers to slit her throat. She is then briefly shown, still alive, until Magneto collapses the ceiling on her. Her fate is unknown until New Ultimates where it is revealed she now wields Thor's hammer. She loses it in battle with the Defenders who now have superpowers due to Loki's intervention. She is killed in the battle which allows Thor to resurrect and face Loki. During the battle, Loki is suddenly killed by a spear thrown by Valkyrie. Although apparently alive again, she reveals that she is now a servant of Hela and departs with Loki's body but not before asking Thor to defend the Earth to which she once belonged.

Exiles

In January 2018, Marvel announced that a version of Valkyrie inspired by Tessa Thompson's portrayal of the character in Thor: Ragnarok would join the Exiles in a series by writer Saladin Ahmed and artist Javier Rodriguez. Ahmed said, "Though she's not technically from the Marvel Cinematic Universe reality, she's basically the literalization of the larger-than-her-physical-frame swagger that Tessa Thompson displayed in Thor: Ragnarok, turned up to 11."

In other media

Television 
 Brunnhilde appears in The Super Hero Squad Show, voiced by Michelle Trachtenberg. In the episode "Mental Organism Designed Only for Kissing!", Thor falls in love with her when she helps him, Ms. Marvel, and Iron Man fight the Abomination, Fin Fang Foom, and MODOK. In the episode "Invader From the Dark Dimension!", Valkyrie joins forces with Thor, the Hulk, Doctor Strange, and the Silver Surfer to form the Defenders and stop Baron Mordo after he possesses Iron Man.
 Brunnhilde appears in The Avengers: Earth's Mightiest Heroes episode "The Fall of Asgard", voiced by Colleen O'Shaughnessey. She, Sif, and the other Valkyries rescue Ant-Man and the Wasp from Ymir and the Frost Giants.
 Valkyrie, based on the MCU incarnation (see below), appears in Guardians of the Galaxy, voiced by Raven-Symoné.

Film
 Brunnhilde appears in the Hulk vs. Thor segment of the Hulk Vs animated film, voiced by an uncredited Nicole Oliver. She and her Valkyrior troops defend Asgard from an attack by the Hulk, who had been separated from Bruce Banner by Loki, only to be knocked aside.
 Brunnhilde appears in Thor: Tales of Asgard, voiced by Cathy Weseluck.

Marvel Cinematic Universe 

Tessa Thompson portrays Valkyrie in media set in the Marvel Cinematic Universe (MCU). 
 Valkyrie is introduced in the live-action film Thor: Ragnarok. Years prior, the Valkyrior were wiped out by Hela when Odin sent them to stop her. As the only survivor after being saved by a fellow warrior, she ended up on Sakaar, where she became one of the Grandmaster's primary warriors under the name Scrapper 142, drinks heavily to cope with her PTSD, and in 2015, befriended the Hulk after he had traveled there. In 2017, Thor arrives following his own battle with Hela and attempts to escape. Valkyrie is initially reluctant to help him, but changes her mind after Loki uses his powers to make her relive the massacre. She joins Thor and Bruce Banner in escaping Sakaar and traveling to Asgard, where she helps the Asgardians evacuate from Hela's undead forces. After Asgard is destroyed by Surtur, she travels with Thor, Hulk, and the Asgardian refugees on the Grandmaster's starship, the Statesman, to find a new home.
 While she does not appear in the live-action film Avengers: Infinity War, the film's director revealed Valkyrie survived the attack on the Statesman and the Blip.
 Valkyrie returns in the live-action film Avengers: Endgame, in which she has settled into the Asgardian refugee community, New Asgard, on Earth. In 2023, she briefly reunites with Banner when he and Rocket arrive to recruit Thor to help them retrieve the Infinity Stones. She later joins the Avengers' final battle against an alternate timeline version of Thanos and is appointed the new ruler of New Asgard by Thor.
 An alternate timeline version of Valkyrie makes a non-speaking appearance in the Disney+ animated series What If...? episode "What If... Thor Were an Only Child?".
 Valkyrie returns in the live-action film Thor: Love and Thunder. Now going by King Valkyrie, or simply Val, she reluctantly addresses the bureaucracy of being New Asgard's king before joining Thor, Korg, and Jane Foster in thwarting Gorr's plot to kill all gods.

Video games
 Brunnhilde appears as an NPC in Marvel: Ultimate Alliance, voiced by Nika Futterman. While attempting to open the Bifrost, Valkyrie asks the heroes to recover her sword, Dragonfang. If they succeed, Loki will be imprisoned and Ragnarok never comes to pass. If not, then Valkyrie will fall in the battle to free Asgard, Balder will die trying to save her, and Asgard will refuse contact with Earth for a century.
 Brunnhilde appears as a playable character in Marvel Super Hero Squad Online, voiced by Grey DeLisle.
 Brunnhilde appears as an unlockable character in Marvel: Avengers Alliance.
 Brunnhilde appears in Marvel Heroes, voiced by Michelle Arthur.
 Brunnhilde appears as a playable character in Lego Marvel's Avengers, voiced by Mary Elizabeth McGlynn.
 The MCU incarnation of Valkyrie appears as a playable character in Lego Marvel Super Heroes 2.
 A teenage Valkyrie based on the MCU incarnation appears in Marvel Avengers Academy.
 The MCU incarnation of Valkyrie appears in Marvel Puzzle Quest.
 Brunnhilde appears in Marvel Ultimate Alliance 3: The Black Order, voiced again by Mary Elizabeth McGlynn.
 Brunnhilde appears in Marvel Future Revolution, voiced again by Mary Elizabeth McGlynn.
 Brunnhilde appears in Marvel Snap.

References

External links
 
 Valkyrie at the Marvel Directory
 
 
 
 
 
 

1997 comics debuts
Avengers (comics) characters
Characters created by Herb Trimpe
Characters created by John Buscema
Characters created by Roy Thomas
Comics characters introduced in 1970
Female characters in film
Black characters in films
Fictional characters with superhuman durability or invulnerability
Fictional goddesses
Fictional queens
Fictional spiritual mediums
Fictional polearm and spearfighters
Fictional swordfighters in comics
Female soldier and warrior characters in comics
Fictional characters with post-traumatic stress disorder
Fictional alcohol abusers
Marvel Comics Asgardians
Marvel Comics characters who can move at superhuman speeds
Marvel Comics characters with accelerated healing
Marvel Comics characters with superhuman strength
Marvel Comics female superheroes
Marvel Comics LGBT superheroes
Marvel Comics titles
Brunhild